Tropical Cyclone Kimi was a small tropical cyclone which briefly threatened the Eastern Coast of North Queensland in January 2021. The tenth tropical low and third tropical cyclone of the 2020–21 Australian region cyclone season, Kimi originated from a weak tropical low which formed northeast of Queensland on 16 January. The low strengthened into Tropical Cyclone Kimi early the next day, as it slowly moved towards the coastline of northeastern Australia. Despite most forecasts depicting a track south into the coast, a vigorous increase in wind shear made the storm shift west away from the coastline just hours ahead of a potential landfall and caused Kimi to significantly weaken, becoming a tropical low by 18 January and dissipating entirely the next day.

Preparations of the storm begun shortly after formation, with watches and warnings being issued for the land in the path of Kimi. Impacts were anticipated to be significant, with the effects of the previous storm to hit the state at the time, Cyclone Imogen, to be exacerbated from the heavy rainfall if it had made landfall. The cyclone's unexpected weakening due to a sudden and unexpected increase of wind shear early on 18 January led to tropical cyclone warnings being cancelled as Kimi became a tropical low. It soon dissipated on 19 January.

Meteorological history

On 12 January, the Bureau of Meteorology noted that a monsoonal trough could develop within a week, that would make conditions in the Australian Region basin favorable for tropical cyclogenesis. On 16 January, a weak tropical low formed to the northeast of Queensland. Later that day, the Joint Typhoon Warning Center (JTWC) issued a Tropical Cyclone Formation Alert on the system. At 02:10 UTC on 17 January, the Bureau of Meteorology upgraded the tropical low into Tropical Cyclone Kimi, while located northeast of Cooktown. A tiny tropical cyclone, Kimi moved slowly southward while remaining offshore of the Australian coastline.

Late on 17 January, radar imagery from Cairns showed low-level convective rainbands, which wrapped into the storm's center of circulation. Around this time, Kimi grew large bursts of convection, with a well-defined circulation visible on satellite imagery. However organization began to slow on 18 January, with convection becoming displaced to the west of the center. Radar from Townsville and satellite imagery showed that wind shear had caused convection to now become displaced to the southeast of the center, as the deep convection itself began to weaken. Late on 18 January, Tropical Cyclone Kimi weakened into a tropical low while moving slowly off the North Queensland coast. At 21:00 UTC that same day, the JTWC issued their final warning on Kimi.

Preparations and impact

On 17 January, a Tropical Cyclone Warning was put in effect from Cape Melville to Cardwell in Queensland, which extended inland to Palmer and Chillagoe. By the next day, a Tropical Cyclone Watch had been issued from Ayr to Bowen, while most of the initial warning zone had been cancelled. A Flood Watch was issued for areas expected to receive heavy rainfall from the storm. The Queensland Fire and Emergency Services advised residents to prepare emergency supplies in the limited time available before the storm. The emergency services also provided sandbags and tarps to protect structures. The Cairns Central was closed on 18 January. The Flecker Botanical Gardens briefly ceased operation starting on 17 January, and the Daintree River Ferry operated for only a part of 18 January. Offshore Cairns, roughly 200 people on Fitzroy Island were evacuated. Ports in Cairns, Port Douglas, Innisfail, and Cooktown were only open for emergency movements, as well as Half Moon Bay Marina. Meteorologist Shane Kennedy said that Kimi will bring significant impacts regardless if it intensifies or not. They also noted that there was a flood risk due to the impacts of Cyclone Imogen. Eleanor Rosam of the SES said crews, such as swiftwater rescue personnel, have been sent on stand-by for the potential impacts of Kimi. She urged those in the path of the incoming storm to prepare. As Kimi became less of a threat to Cairns, many places and services that had previously announced cancellations and closure were reopened.

As Kimi moved further south, the Townsville Airport ceased operations between 18 and 19 January. The cyclone prompted an emergency alert for Palm Island, which expected a close pass. Once preparations were complete, many residents of Queensland hunkered down for the storm. However, forecast tracks soon depicted Kimi moving away from the coast of Australia. The Bureau of Meteorology officials called the storm "erratic" and "unusually unpredictable" due to its small size.

As early as 18 January, large waves occurred between the towns of Yarrabah and Lucinda in the Australian state of Queensland. At that time, stormy weather was also affecting portions of the state. Areas still received flash flooding despite the absence of a direct hit from Kimi, most notably around Innisfail, which recorded some of the highest rainfall totals including a 158 mm (6.22 in) reading at a gauge in the town.

See also

 Tropical cyclones in 2021
 Cyclone Tasha
 Cyclone Yasi

References

External links 

 Australian Bureau of Meteorology
 Joint Typhoon Warning Center
 Tropical Cyclone Warning Center Jakarta 

Kimi
2021 in Australia
Kimi